South West Ham Football Club was a football club based in Canning Town, England.

History
South West Ham were formed in the 1880s as a club for the "healthy pursuit of football" for the working class demographic in the surrounding area. During the early years of the club, South West Ham helped produce future West Ham United players in Billy Barnes and Aubrey Fair. In 1895–96, South West Ham joined the South Essex League, finishing fourth. In 1896, South West Ham entered the FA Cup at the preliminary stage, losing 4–1 to Windsor & Eton. In 1899, the club entered the Eastern Suburban League. The club dissolved in the early 20th century.

Ground
South West Ham played at the cricket ground occupied by South West Ham Cricket Club on North Woolwich Road in Canning Town.

Records
Best FA Cup performance: Preliminary round, 1896–97

Honours
South Essex League
Second Division (Western) champions: 1906–07

References

Canning Town
Defunct football clubs in England
Defunct football clubs in London
1880s disestablishments in England
Association football clubs established in the 1880s
Association football clubs disestablished in the 1900s
1900s disestablishments in England
South Essex League
Sport in the London Borough of Newham
London League (football)